The 2021 season was the Pittsburgh Steelers' 89th season in the National Football League, their 22nd and final season under general manager Kevin Colbert and their 15th under head coach Mike Tomlin. They failed to improve upon their 12–4 record from 2020 and failed to win their division in back to back years for the first time since 2016–2017. However, they did make the playoffs in consecutive years for the first time since 2014–2017 after defeating the Baltimore Ravens, combined with the Las Vegas Raiders defeating the Los Angeles Chargers, and the Jacksonville Jaguars upsetting the Indianapolis Colts, all of which took place during the Sunday games of Week 18. However the Steelers were defeated in the first round of the playoffs by the Kansas City Chiefs 42–21.

For the first time since 2009, center Maurkice Pouncey was not on the roster, as he announced his retirement on February 12. Also, for the first time since 2011, guard David DeCastro was not  on the roster, as he was released by the Steelers on June 24. It was also quarterback Ben Roethlisberger's final season with the Steelers as he announced his retirement on January 27, 2022, after 18 seasons with the team. A 6-time Pro Bowler, Roethlisberger led the Steelers to 12 playoff appearances and 3 Super Bowl appearances, winning 2 of them in 2005 and 2008 respectively. He also retired as 5th all-time in passing yards, and was the last remaining active quarterback from the 2004 Draft class.

It was also the final season that the team’s home stadium was known as Heinz Field, as it was announced that the naming rights were bought by Michigan-based insurance company Acrisure in a deal initially reported on July 11, 2022 after Kraft-Heinz, who owned the original rights to the stadium’s name since its grand opening in 2001, decided not to sign a new deal with the Steelers, officially ending its 21-year business arrangement, renaming it Acrisure Stadium in the process. The decision to rename the stadium has been received overwhelmingly negatively by Steelers fans.

Transactions
The Steelers have been involved in the following transactions during the 2021 season:

Free agent signings

Lost

Acquired

Cuts

Draft

Undrafted free agents 

Pre-draft trades
 Pittsburgh was awarded a compensatory selection in the fourth round (140th overall).
 Pittsburgh traded its fifth-round selection to Baltimore in exchange for defensive end Chris Wormley and a seventh-round selection.
 Pittsburgh traded a sixth-round selection and 2020 first- and fifth-round selections to Miami in exchange for a seventh-round selection, a 2020 fourth-round selection, and safety Minkah Fitzpatrick.
 Pittsburgh acquired a sixth-round selection from Tampa Bay in exchange for offensive tackle Jerald Hawkins and a seventh-round selection.

Staff

Final roster

Preseason
On February 15, the NFL announced that the Steelers would face the Dallas Cowboys in the Pro Football Hall of Fame Game on Thursday, August 5, at Tom Benson Hall of Fame Stadium in Canton, Ohio. The game kicked off at 8:00 p.m. EDT, televised by Fox. The Steelers were represented by former head coach Bill Cowher and safeties Troy Polamalu and Donnie Shell. The Steelers and Cowboys were scheduled to play in the 2020 Hall of Fame game; however, the game, the annual Hall of Fame enshrinement, along with the entire 2020 preseason, were cancelled due to the COVID-19 pandemic, and the Hall of Fame game between the Steelers and Cowboys was rescheduled for 2021. The Steelers ended up defeating the Cowboys by a score of 16–3.

The remainder of the Steelers' preseason opponents and schedule was announced on May 12.

Regular season

Schedule
The Steelers' 2021 schedule was announced on May 12.

Note: Intra-division opponents are in bold text.

Game summaries

Week 1: at Buffalo Bills

The Steelers started their season on the road against the Bills. The first half was all Bills scoring when Tyler Bass kicked a 37-yard field goal to make it 3-0 in the first. In the second quarter, they made the halftime score 10-0 when Josh Allen found Gabe Davis for a 3-yard touchdown pass. After halftime, the Steelers went to work, with Chris Boswell scoring 2 field goals in the third quarter, from 24 and 20 yards out, to make it 10-3 and then 10-6. In the fourth quarter, the Steelers would take the lead when Ben Roethlisberger found Diontae Johnson on a 5-yard touchdown pass to make it 13-10. Miles Killebrew then blocked a punt and Ulysees Gilbert III returned it 9 yards for a touchdown to make it 20-10. The Bills drew closer when Bass kicked a 23-yard field goal to make it 20-13. The Steelers responded with a 45-yard field goal from Boswell to make it 23-13. The Bills then once again came within a touchdown when Bass kicked a 42-yard field goal to make it 23-16. The Bills then tried for an onside kick. However, JuJu Smith-Schuster would recover the kick, sealing the Steelers' victory.

With the win, the Steelers started 1-0.

Week 2: vs. Las Vegas Raiders

After a tough road win, the Steelers headed home to face the Raiders. In the first quarter, Raiders kicker Daniel Carlson kicked a 46-yard field goal to get his team on the board 3-0. They would make it 6-0 in the second quarter when Carlson kicked a 33-yard field goal. The Steelers took the lead when JuJu Smith-Schuster ran for a 3-yard touchdown to make it 7-6. However, the Raiders took the lead back when Carlson kicked a 41-yard field goal to make it 9-7 at halftime. The Raiders increased their lead in the third quarter when Derek Carr found Foster Moreau on a 9-yard touchdown pass to make it 16-7. The Steelers then came within 2 points after Ben Roethlisberger found Najee Harris on a 25-yard touchdown pass to make it 16-14. The Raiders then pulled away when Carr found Henry Ruggs III on a 61-yard touchdown pass to make it 23-14. Chris Boswell then kicked a 56-yard field goal to bring the Steelers within 6, 23-17. The Raiders were able to seal the victory with Carlson's 45-yard field goal to make the final score 26-17.

With the loss, the Steelers fell to 1-1. They lost to the Raiders at home for the first time since 2009.

Week 3: vs. Cincinnati Bengals

After a tough loss, the Steelers stayed home for Round 1 against the Bengals. The Bengals scored first in the first quarter for their only score when Joe Burrow found Tyler Boyd on a 17-yard touchdown pass to make it 7-0. The Steelers tied it up in the second quarter when Ben Roethlisberger found Pat Freiermuth on a 4-yard touchdown pass to make it 7-7. The Bengals took the lead back when Burrow found Ja'Marr Chase on a 34-yard touchdown pass for a 14-7 halftime lead. After the break, the Bengals went back to work in the third quarter, scoring twice: Evan McPhearson kicked a 43-yard field goal to make it 17-7, followed by Burrow's third touchdown pass of the day (and second pass to Chase) to make it 24-7. In the fourth quarter, only the Steelers would score with Chris Boswell's 26-yard field goal to make the eventual final score 24-10.

With the loss, the Steelers fell to 1-2.  Coupled with wins by the Ravens and Browns, they finished the week in last place in the AFC North. The team lost their second straight game to the Bengals, losing to them in Pittsburgh for the first time since 2015.

Week 4: at Green Bay Packers

After a tough home loss, the Steelers traveled west to take on the Packers. The Steelers scored the only points in the first quarter when Ben Roethlisberger found Diontae Johnson on a 45-yard touchdown pass to make it 7-0. However, the Packers would take the lead in the second quarter by making it 14-7 by way of Aaron Rodgers 1-yard touchdown run, followed by a 23-yard touchdown pass to Randall Cobb. The Steelers shortened the lead to 4 when Chris Boswell kicked a 53-yard field goal. The Packers moved up by a touchdown after Mason Crosby kicked a 26-yard field goal to make it 17-10 at halftime. In the third quarter, it was all Packers as Crosby made a 29-yard field goal, followed by Rodgers' second touchdown pass to Cobb from a yard out to make it 27-10. The Steelers scored the only points of the fourth quarter with Najee Harris's 1-yard touchdown run to make the final score 27-17.

With the loss, the Steelers fell to 1-3.

Week 5: vs. Denver Broncos

After a third straight loss, the Steelers returned home to face the Broncos. It was a back-and-forth game in which Roethlisberger posted his first game of the season with more than one touchdown pass. The game saw Pittsburgh up 24–6 at one point before Broncos quarterback Teddy Bridgewater passed for two touchdowns in the 4th quarter. The Steelers then extended their lead to 27–19 by way of Boswell's 43-yard field goal. With under a minute left, the Broncos drove down deep into Steelers' territory. Bridgewater threw the game-losing interception to cornerback James Pierre, sealing the Steelers' victory and snapping their 3-game losing skid.

With the win, the Steelers improved to 2–3. Unfortunately, any celebration was muted as the team later learned the full diagnosis of the midgame injury sustained by JuJu Smith-Schuster; a dislocated shoulder from a hit delivered by Kareem Jackson, which was initially believed to have ended his season. Smith-Schuster, however, would heal quicker than originally anticipated and make a surprise recovery and return to the lineup just in time for the playoffs.

Week 6: vs. Seattle Seahawks

After a tough home win, the Steelers stayed home for a Sunday Night duel against the Seahawks, who would be missing Russell Wilson after he suffered a finger injury the previous week. After a scoreless first quarter, the Steelers went up 14-0 at halftime in the second after Ben Roethlisberger found Najee Harris on a 5-yard touchdown pass, followed by Eric Ebron's 1-yard run for a touchdown. After the break, the Seahawks were able to get on the board in the third when Alex Collins ran for a 3-yard touchdown to make the score 14-7. Chris Boswell then increased the Steelers' lead when he kicked a 27-yard field goal to make it 17-7. The Seahawks came within 3 when Geno Smith found Will Dissly on a 1-yard touchdown pass to make the score 17-14. Then in the fourth quarter, they tied the game when Jason Myers kicked a 40-yard field goal at 17-17. The Steelers retook the lead when Boswell kicked a 52-yard field goal. However, with seconds left in regulation, Myers would kick a 43-yard field goal to tie the game at 20-20. In overtime, T. J. Watt forced a Geno Smith fumble recovered by Devin Bush that would lead to Boswell kicking the 37-yard game-winning field goal to make the final score 23-20.

With the win, the Steelers improved to 3-3.

Week 8: at Cleveland Browns

Coming off the bye week, the Steelers headed to Cleveland for game 1 against the Browns.  In the first quarter, the Browns scored when Chase McLaughlin kicked 30-yard field goal to make it 3-0 for the quarter's only score.  The Steelers tied the game up at 3-3 when Chris Boswell kicked a 31-yard field goal.  This was the score at halftime.  After the break, the Browns would retake the lead when D'Ernest Johnson ran for a 10-yard touchdown to make it 10-3.  The Steelers then came within a point later on in the quarter when Najee Harris ran for an 8-yard touchdown (with a failed 2-point conversion) to make it 10-9.  In the fourth quarter, the Steelers scored the only points when Ben Roethlisberger found Pat Freiermuth on a 2-yard touchdown pass (with another failed 2-point conversion) to make the eventual final score 15-10.

With their third straight win, the Steelers were able to snap their 2-game losing streak to the Browns and improve to 4-3.

Week 9: vs. Chicago Bears

After a tough road win, the Steelers headed home to take on the Bears. They would score the first quarter's only points when Najee Harris ran for a 10-yard touchdown. They made it 14-0 in the second when Ben Roethlisberger found Pat Freiermuth on a 4-yard touchdown pass. The Bears were able to get on the board before halftime when Cairo Santos kicked a 30-yard field goal to make the score 14-3. In the third quarter, the Bears scored again as Santos made it 14-6 with a 22-yard field goal. However, the Steelers pulled ahead by double digits as Roethlisberger and Freiermuth hooked up again on a 10-yard touchdown pass (with a failed PAT) to make it 20-6. In the fourth quarter, the Bears shortened the lead to 7 when Darnell Mooney ran for a 15-yard touchdown to make it 20-13. The Steelers then pulled away as Chris Boswell kicked a 54-yard field goal to make it 23-13. The Bears then answered by coming within 3 when DeAndre Houston-Carson recovered a fumbled punt return by Ray-Ray McCloud and returned it 53 yards for a touchdown to make it 23-20. But the Steelers increased their lead to make it 26-20 when Boswell kicked a 52-yard field goal. The Bears then took the lead when Justin Fields found Mooney on a 16-yard touchdown pass to make it 27-26. But the Steelers came back to take the lead yet again when Boswell kicked a 40-yard field goal to make it 29-27. With seconds left, the Bears tried for a 65-yard field goal from Santos, however the ball would fall several yards short of the goal post and miss, sealing the win for the Steelers.

With their fourth straight win, the Steelers improved to 5–3. They have now won 19 straight home games on Monday Night Football and are now 215–0–2 in franchise history when leading by 14 or more points during the fourth quarter of a home game. This was the team's first win against Chicago under Mike Tomlin; the Steelers lost the first three such meetings.

Week 10: vs. Detroit Lions

After a tough win at home, the Steelers stayed home for a game against the Lions.  The Steelers scored the only points in the first quarter when Mason Rudolph found James Washington on a 9-yard touchdown pass to make it 7-0.  In the second quarter, the Lions were able to tie it up at 7-7 when Jermar Jefferson ran for a 28-yard touchdown.  The Steelers moved back into the lead when Chris Boswell kicked a 20-yard field goal to make it 10-7.  However, the Lions would tie it up again at 10-10 when Ryan Santoso kicked a 20-yard field goal at halftime.  In the third quarter, the Lions took the lead when Godwin Igwebuike ran for a 42-yard touchdown (with a failed PAT) to make it 16-10.  Though, the Steelers came within 3 when Boswell kicked a 23-yard field goal to make it 16-13.  In the fourth quarter, the Steelers managed to tie the game up at 16-16 when Boswell kicked a 51-yard field goal.  The game would go into overtime with both teams failing to score, securing a tie.

With the tie, the Steelers fell to 5-3-1.  It was good enough for the team to hold onto second place in the AFC North.

Week 11: at Los Angeles Chargers

After the unfortunate tie at home against the Lions, the Steelers traveled to Los Angeles for a game against the Chargers.  The Steelers were able to score 3-0 when Chris Boswell kicked a 36-yard field goal.  The Chargers made it 7-3 when Austin Ekeler ran for a 6-yard touchdown.  They would make it 14-3 when Justin Herbert connected with Ekeler for a 10-yard touchdown pass.  The Steelers came within 4 when Ben Roethlisberger found Diontae Johnson on a 10-yard touchdown pass to make it 14-10.  The Chargers moved ahead by a touchdown when Dustin Hopkins kicked a 30-yard field goal to make it 17-10 at halftime.  The Chargers would add to their lead in the third quarter when Herbert and Ekeler connected again for a 17-yard touchdown pass, making the score 24-10 and then 27-10 when Hopkins kicked a 41-yard field goal.  In the fourth quarter, the Steelers came closer when Boswell kicked another 36-yard field goal to make it 27-13 and then 27-20 when Najee Harris ran for a 1-yard touchdown.  Though, the Chargers moved ahead by a couple touchdowns again when Ekeler ran for a 5-yard touchdown for a 34-20 lead.  The Steelers put up 3 straight scores to take the lead:  Roethlisberger found Eric Ebron on a 5-yard touchdown pass, shortening the lead to 34-27, followed up with Roethlisberger connecting with Pat Freiermuth on a 5-yard touchdown pass to tie the game at 34-34, followed by Boswell's lead-taking 45-yard field goal to make it 37-34.  However, the Chargers moved back into the lead with Herbert's 53-yard touchdown pass to Mike Williams for a 41-37 game.  The Steelers got the ball back, but couldn't move the ball any further as Roethlisberger was sacked twice, sealing the Chargers' win.

With the loss, the Steelers fell to 5-4-1 and third place in the AFC North.

Week 12: at Cincinnati Bengals

After a tough loss, the Steelers traveled to Cincinnati for Round 2 against the Bengals.  The Bengals scored first in the first quarter when Joe Burrow ran for an 8-yard touchdown to make it 7-0.  They made it 10-0 when Evan McPherson kicked a 31-yard field goal.  The Steelers got on the board later on when Chris Boswell kicked a 40-yard field goal to make it 10-3.  Though, the Bengals would score 31 consecutive points to make it 41-3, before Ben Roethlisberger found Pat Freiermuth on a 15-yard touchdown pass to make the final score 41-10.

With their third straight loss to the Bengals, the Steelers fell to 5-5-1 and were swept by the Bengals for the first time since 2009. The 31-point deficit is the largest margin of loss against the Bengals since Week 2 of the 1989 season, which also ended with a final score of 41-10.

Week 13: vs. Baltimore Ravens

After being swept by the Bengals, the Steelers returned home for Round 1 against the Ravens.  After a scoreless first quarter, the Ravens scored first in the second when Devonta Freeman ran for a 3-yard touchdown to make it 7-0.  Chris Boswell was able to get the Steelers on the board at halftime when he kicked a 53-yard field goal to make it 7-3.  In the third quarter, the Ravens scored the only points when Justin Tucker kicked a 35-yard field goal, putting his team up 10-3.  In the fourth quarter, the Steelers came within a point when Ben Roethlisberger found Diontae Johnson on a 26-yard touchdown pass (with a failed PAT) to make it 10-9.  Though, the Ravens made it a 4-point game when Tucker kicked a 28-yard field to make it 13-9.  The Steelers then scored twice to take a 20-13 lead after Boswell kicked a 43-yard field goal and then Roethlisberger connected with Johnson again on a 5-yard touchdown pass.  The Ravens then made it 20-19 when Lamar Jackson found Sammy Watkins on a 6-yard touchdown pass (with a failed 2-point conversion).  The Ravens then tried for an onside kick, but it would be recovered by the Steelers, sealing the victory.

With their third straight win over the Ravens, the Steelers improved to 6-5-1 and third place in the AFC North.

Week 14: at Minnesota Vikings

After a tough home win over the Ravens, the Steelers traveled to Minneapolis for a Thursday Night game against the Vikings.  The Vikings were able to jump out to a 29-0 lead through the third quarter before the Steelers scored 3 straight times to make it 29-20.  Kirk Cousins then found K.J. Osborn on a 62-yard touchdown pass to make it 36-20.  The Steelers scored the final points of the game when Ben Roethlisberger found Pat Freiermuth on a 15-yard touchdown pass (with a successful 2-point conversion) to make the final score 36-28. However, the Steelers final drive ended in an incompletion allowing the Vikings to escape with a win.

With the loss, the Steelers fell to 6-6-1.  With the Browns' win over the Ravens on Sunday, they fell to last place in the AFC North.

Week 15: vs. Tennessee Titans

After another tough loss, the Steelers headed home for a game against the Titans. In the first quarter, the Titans made it 10-0 with Ryan Tannehill's 1-yard touchdown run followed by Randy Bullock's 26-yard field goal. In the second quarter, the Steelers managed to get on the board when Chris Boswell kicked a 36-yard field goal to make it 10-3. The Titans went up 13-3 before halftime when Bullock kicked a 32-yard field goal. In the second half, it was all Steelers, with a Ben Roethlisberger 1-yard rushing touchdown and three more Boswell field goals, making the final score 19-13.

With the win, the Steelers improved to 7-6-1. A Ravens loss later in the day brought the Steelers within one-half of a game of the division lead.

Week 16: at Kansas City Chiefs

After a tough win at home, the Steelers traveled to take on the Chiefs. Throughout the first 3 quarters, the Chiefs managed to jump out to a 30–0 lead before the Steelers finally got on the board when Chris Boswell kicked a 34-yard field goal with 3:34 to go in the third. In the fourth quarter, the Chiefs then scored a couple more field goals from Elliot Fry: from 34 and 30 yards out to make it 36–3. Ben Roethlisberger then found Diontae Johnson on a 15-yard touchdown pass to make the final score 36–10.

With the loss, the Steelers fell to 7–7–1 and third place in the AFC North.

Week 17: vs. Cleveland Browns

After a tough road loss, the Steelers headed home for Game 2 against the Browns.  After a scoreless first quarter, the Steelers were able to get on the board in the second after Ben Roethlisberger and Diontae Johnson connected on a 5-yard touchdown pass to make it 7-0.  They would make it 10-0 at halftime when Chris Boswell kicked a 22-yard field goal.  In the third quarter, the Steelers went up 13-0 after Boswell kicked a 30-yard field goal.  The Browns got on the board later on in the quarter, when Baker Mayfield found David Njoku on a 3-yard touchdown pass to make it 13-7.  The Steelers however, pulled away again as Boswell kicked a couple field goals: from 50 and 48 yards out to make the score 19-7.  The Browns then shortened the lead to 5 when Mayfield found Harrison Bryant on a 1-yard touchdown pass to make the score 19-14.  However, the Steelers were able to secure the victory when Najee Harris ran for a 37-yard touchdown, making the final score 26-14. The game was significant for reasons outside of the playoff hunt, as it was widely expected to be the last home game for QB Ben Roethlisberger. Throughout the game, the Heinz Field crowd broke out in chants for Roethlisberger, who gave an emotional interview after the game and circled the field thanking the fans before leaving with his family.

With the win, the Steelers improved to 8-7-1 and second place in the AFC North and also remained in the AFC playoff hunt.  They would also sweep the Browns for the first time since 2017.

Week 18: at Baltimore Ravens

The Steelers ended their season in Baltimore for Round 2 against the Ravens. In the first quarter, the Steelers scored the only points when Chris Boswell kicked a 28-yard field goal to make it 3–0. The Ravens tied it up at 3–3 in the second quarter when Justin Tucker kicked a 24-yard field goal. This would be the score at halftime. In the third quarter, the Ravens moved into the lead when Latavius Murray ran for a 46-yard touchdown to make it 10–3. The Steelers then came within 4 when Boswell kicked a 40-yard field goal, making the score 10–6. The Steelers retook the lead in the fourth quarter when Ben Roethlisberger found Chase Claypool on a 6-yard touchdown pass to make it 13–10. Tucker then tied the game up at 13–13 with a 46-yard field goal. In overtime, the Steelers were able to drive down the field and eventually Boswell was brought out to kick the game-winning 36-yard field goal to win the game 16–13. Head coach Mike Tomlin recorded his 162nd win with the Steelers, surpassing his predecessor, Bill Cowher's record of 161 wins to become the 2nd winningest head coach in franchise history, only behind Chuck Noll, whom coached the team from 1969-1991.

With the win, the Steelers finished the regular season at 9–7–1 and swept the Ravens for the second straight season, and also eliminated them from the playoffs.

The Steelers clinched a playoff berth due to their victory over the Ravens in conjunction with the Jaguars' defeat of the Colts and the Raiders' defeat of the Chargers on Sunday Night Football.

Standings

Division

Conference

Postseason

Schedule

Game summaries

AFC Wild Card Playoffs: at (2) Kansas City Chiefs

In quarterback Ben Roethlisberger's final NFL game, the #7 seeded Steelers traveled to take on the #2 seeded Chiefs.  Both teams would go scoreless in the first quarter before the Steelers scored first in the second quarter with T. J. Watt's 26-yard fumble return for a touchdown.  Though, the Chiefs scored 3 straight touchdowns before halftime, making it 21-7.  In the third quarter, they made it 35-7 after a couple more touchdowns.  Though, the Steelers shortened the lead to 21 when Ben Roethlisberger found Diontae Johnson on a 13-yard touchdown pass, making it 35-14.  The Chiefs then pulled away when Travis Kelce threw a 2-yard touchdown pass to Byron Pringle to make it 42-14.  The Steelers then scored the remaining 7 points from Roethlisberger to James Washington to make the final score 42-21.

With the loss, the Steelers finished their season with an overall record of 9-8-1.

Statistics

Team

Individual

Statistics correct as of the end of the 2021 NFL season

References

External links
 

Pittsburgh
Pittsburgh Steelers seasons
Pittsburgh Steelers
2020s in Pittsburgh